Steve Kaufmann (born 8 October 1945) is a Canadian polyglot.

Background 
Kaufmann was born in Sweden in 1945 to Jewish parents from the town of Prostějov in Czechoslovakia, now in the Czech Republic. His parents were bilingual in both Czech and German.  At the age of five, in 1951, the family moved to Montreal, Canada, where he grew up. In June 1962, Kaufmann quit his construction job and looked to find a ship in the docks he could work on in exchange for taking him to Europe. On his third attempt at asking, he was given a job aboard the German tramp steamer, the Gerda Schell, which had lost a sailor in Quebec City. He arrived in London ten days later. After a week there he caught a ferry at Dover and landed in Ostend, Belgium, before heading to France. After a year living in Grenoble, he continued studying politics at the L'Institut d'Études Politiques (Institute of Political Studies, commonly known as Sciences Po) and learning French in Paris. 

Kaufmann hitchhiked through Europe after his studies, picking up basic language skills in Spain, Italy and Germany. He went on to join the Canadian diplomatic service, where he began learning Mandarin in Hong Kong in 1969, and became fluent in it within a year of full-time studying.  When re-posted to the Canadian embassy in Japan in the early 1970s, he had to learn Japanese.

Moving from his role as a trade commissioner, he then used his language ability in commercial trade, living in Japan for 9 years. Eventually, mainly later in life, he started learning more languages.

Current work 

Kaufmann appears at conferences to speak on his language learning techniques and abilities. He also runs a number of social media channels discussing his experiences of language learning and suggested techniques, both of which focus on language learning techniques and assisting people who are learning language.

He was one of the founding organisers of the North American Polyglot symposium. Kaufmann travels to learn languages, and has given numerous interviews in native languages on various television channels around the world, in languages such as Chinese, Russian and Ukrainian. He has been a regular contributor to the Huffington Post.

Language learning 
Kaufmann has spent over 50 years studying languages. He advocates total immersion in the learning process. He places great emphasis on absorbing the language by reading texts and by not worrying too much about unfamiliar words, believing that they will gradually be acquired through repeated reading. Though he supports using techniques such as flashcards for memorizing difficult words, most of his learning time goes into listening to native speakers and reading texts. He is particularly fond of reading books on the history of the country or region of the language he is learning in the native language. Kaufmann prefers not to have a fixed daily schedule when learning a language. He enjoys listening to content in his target languages while performing other tasks. He states that age is not necessarily an impediment to learning a language, and that it is possible for older people to learn languages as well as younger people. He also recognizes mistakes as a natural part of the learning process, and believes that people can still be considered fluent even while making some mistakes.

Kaufmann started to learn Russian, his 9th language, when he was 60. He has stated that he rarely writes in the languages, and that revisiting acquired languages he is out of practice in can be challenging initially when interacting with a native speaker. The languages he speaks aside from English are: French, Mandarin, Cantonese, Japanese, Korean, Russian, Swedish, German, Italian, Spanish, Portuguese, Ukrainian, Czech, Slovak, and Romanian. He also learned some Greek and Turkish and is currently learning Arabic and Persian.

The prominent scholar of language acquisition Stephen Krashen has studied Kaufmann's approach to language learning as well as that of other polyglots such as Kató Lomb. Krashen claims the success of Kaufmann and other polyglots as independent support for his own ideas on second language learning, and sees Kaufmann's approach as a model for other language learners. He has praised Kaufmann as "really good, no question" and has said that "he has been my language therapist, helping me."

References 

1945 births
Canadian expatriates in France
Canadian expatriates in Japan
Canadian Jews
Canadian people of Czech descent
Living people
Sciences Po alumni
Swedish emigrants to Canada